The women's foil was one of eight fencing events on the fencing at the 1964 Summer Olympics programme. It was the ninth appearance of the event. The competition was held from October 14 – 15, 1964. 39 fencers from 17 nations competed.

Medalists

Results

Round 1

Round 2

Knockout rounds

The winner of each group advanced to the final pool, while the runner-up moved into a 5th-place semifinal.

Group 1

Group 2

Group 3

Group 4

Fifth place semifinal

Final

References

Sources
 

Fencing at the 1964 Summer Olympics
Olymp
Fen